The Wales national futsal team is controlled by the Football Association of Wales, the governing body for futsal in Wales and represents the country in international futsal competitions, such as the Futsal World Cup and the European Championships.

The creation of the Wales futsal team was first announced in late 2011, an FAW Futsal squad was named for a one-day training camp and fixture in Cardiff on 18 December at Cardiff University, to begin the FAW's preparations for the UEFA Futsal Championship qualification in January 2013. A second training camp was held on 11 March 2012 and Wales played the England Development squad on 15 April. England won the game 8–6 in Deeside, Flintshire.

On 6 and 7 July, Wales played two friendlies against AC Omonia's futsal team, the current Cypriot champions. Wales played their first official international match against Andorra in September 2012 and took part in qualification for the first time in January 2013 in the UEFA Futsal Championship qualifiers.

Current squad

''The Proposed Inaugural FAW Futsal Squad. These players have all represented the Wales national futsal team.

Tournament records

FIFA Futsal World Cup

UEFA Futsal Championship

References

External links
 Official website

European national futsal teams
futsal
Futsal in Wales